Novopetrovskoye is a rural locality (a selo) in Ivanovsky Selsoviet, Khaybullinsky District, Bashkortostan, Russia. The population was 44 as of 2010.

References 

Rural localities in Khaybullinsky District